The 2012 Southern Illinois Salukis football team represented Southern Illinois University Carbondale as a member of the Missouri Valley Football Conference (MVFC) during the 2012 NCAA Division I FCS football season. Led by fifth-year head coach Dale Lennon, the Salukis compiled an overall record of 6–5 with a mark of 5–3 in conference play, placing in a three-way tie for third in the MVFC. Southern Illinois played home games at Saluki Stadium in Carbondale, Illinois.

Schedule

References

Southern Illinois
Southern Illinois Salukis football seasons
Southern Illinois Salukis football